Will Firth (born 23 May 1965) is an Australian literary translator who focuses on contemporary writing from the Serbo-Croatian speaking countries and North Macedonia.

He graduated in German and Russian (with Serbo-Croatian as a minor) from the Australian National University in Canberra in 1986 (BA). He won a scholarship to read South Slavic studies at the University of Zagreb in the 1988–89 academic year and spent a further postgraduate year at the Pushkin Institute in Moscow in 1989–90. Subsequently, he qualified as a translator from Croatian, German, Macedonian and Russian with the National Accreditation Authority for Translators and Interpreters (NAATI) in Australia. Since 1991 he has been living in Germany, where he works as a freelance translator of literature and the humanities. He translates from Russian, Macedonian, and all variants of Serbo-Croatian into English, occasionally into German. In 2005-07 he worked for the International Criminal Tribunal for the former Yugoslavia (ICTY). Since the mid-2000s, Firth has largely been translating works of South Slavic literature. He is a member of the professional associations of translators in the UK (Translators Association) and Germany (VdÜ). Firth has been an Esperantist since 1985.

Major translations

Translations into English

From Macedonian 

 Anya's Diary (Дневникот на Ања), children's novel by Dimitar Baševski, Slovo, Skopje, 2007
 Pirey (Пиреј), novel by Petre M. Andreevski, Pollitecon Publications, Sydney, 2009 (co-translated with Mirjana Simjanovska)
 Stolen Thoughts (Украдени мисли), bilingual collection of poetry by Dušan Ristevski, Macedonian Literary Association “Grigor Prlichev”, Sydney, 2011
 The Sunrise in My Dream (Угрејсонце во мојот сон), bilingual collection of poetry by Ivan Trposki, Macedonian Literary Association “Grigor Prlichev”, Sydney, 2013
Homunculus (Човечулец), short stories by Aleksandar Prokopiev, Istros Books, London, 2015
 The Eighth Wonder of the World (Осмото светско чудо), novel by Jordan Plevneš, Plamen Press, Washington, D.C., 2020

From Bosnian/Croatian/Montenegrin/Serbian 

Hansen's Children (Hansenova djeca), novel by Ognjen Spahić, Istros Books, London, 2011
 The Coming (Dolazak), novel by Andrej Nikolaidis, Istros Books, London, 2011
 Our Man in Iraq, novel by Robert Perišić, Istros Books, London, 2012, and Black Balloon Publishing, New York City, 2013  
 A Handful of Sand (To malo pijeska na dlanu), novel by Marinko Koščec, Istros Books, London, 2013
 The Storm in the Still Life (Mrtva priroda i živo srce), epistolary novel by Ivan B. Vodopija, Ex Libris, Zagreb, 2013
 The Son (Sin), novel by Andrej Nikolaidis, Istros Books, London, 2013 
 Ekaterini, novel by Marija Knežević, Istros Books, London, 2013
 The Great War (Veliki rat), novel by Aleksandar Gatalica, Istros Books, London, 2014
 Till Kingdom Come (Devet), novel by Andrej Nikolaidis, Istros Books, London, 2015
 Quiet Flows the Una (Knjiga o Uni), novel by Faruk Šehić, Istros Books, London, 2016
 Journey to Russia (Izlet u Rusiju), travelogue by Miroslav Krleža, Sandorf, Zagreb, 2017
 Head Full of Joy (Puna glava radosti), short stories by Ognjen Spahić, Dalkey Archive Press, Victoria, 2018
 Mothers and Daughters (Dabogda te majka rodila), novel by Vedrana Rudan, Dalkey Archive Press, Victoria, 2018
 A Novel of London (Roman o Londonu), novel by Miloš Crnjanski, Diálogos, New Orleans, 2020
 From Nowhere to Nowhere (Nigdje, niotkuda), novel by Bekim Sejranović, Sandorf, Zagreb, 2020
 Divine Child (Božanska dječica), novel by Tatjana Gromača, Sandorf Passage, South Portland, 2021
 Horror and Huge Expenses (Užas i veliki troškovi), short stories by Robert Perišić, Sandorf Passage, South Portland, 2021

Translations into German

From Macedonian 

 Der große Koffer (Големиот куфер), short stories by Ivan Dodovski, Edition Erata, Leipzig, 2008
 Das Buch der Mutter (Ервехе. Книга за една мајка), novel by Luan Starova, Wieser Verlag, Klagenfurt, 2010
 Das achte Weltwunder (Осмото светско чудо), novel by Jordan Plevneš, Leipziger Literaturverlag, Leipzig, 2015

From Bosnian/Croatian/Montenegrin/Serbian 

 Die göttlichen Kindchen (Božanska dječica), novel by Tatjana Gromača, STROUX edition, München 2022

References

External links 
 
 Interview

1965 births
Living people
Australian translators
Russian–English translators
Serbian–English translators
Translators from Macedonian
German–English translators
Translators to German